Dramane Diarra (born 19 November 1980 in Paris) is a French basketball player who played 27 games for French Pro A league club Reims during the 2006-2007 season.

References

1980 births
Living people
French men's basketball players
Basketball players from Paris
21st-century French people